Myrmecia varians is an Australian ant which belongs to the genus Myrmecia. This species is native to Australia. The Myrmecia varians is one of the most distributed ants in the country, with the species being observed in every single state and territory except for Tasmania. Myrmecia varians was first described by Mayr in 1876.

Appearance
The Myrmecia varians is a smaller species of bull ant. The workers for the average worker is around 11–12.5 millimetres in length and queens grow up to 15-16 millimetres in length. The head, thorax, and gaster are black; mandibles and basal, and half of scapes are a yellowish-brown, and the apex and teeth are more reddish. Legs are yellowish-red; node and postpetiole is also red.

References

Myrmeciinae
Hymenoptera of Australia
Insects described in 1876
Insects of Australia